ISO 3166-2:MZ is the entry for Mozambique in ISO 3166-2, part of the ISO 3166 standard published by the International Organization for Standardization (ISO), which defines codes for the names of the principal subdivisions (e.g., provinces or states) of all countries coded in ISO 3166-1.

Currently for Mozambique, ISO 3166-2 codes are defined for 1 city and 10 provinces. The city Maputo is the capital of the country and has special status equal to the provinces.

Each code consists of two parts, separated by a hyphen. The second part is either of the following:
 one letter: provinces
 three letters: city

Current codes
Subdivision names are listed as in the ISO 3166-2 standard published by the ISO 3166 Maintenance Agency (ISO 3166/MA).

Click on the button in the header to sort each column.

See also
 Subdivisions of Mozambique
 FIPS region codes of Mozambique

External links
 ISO Online Browsing Platform: MZ
 Provinces of Mozambique, Statoids.com

2:MZ
ISO 3166-2
Mozambique geography-related lists